"SOS" is the first posthumous single by Swedish DJ Avicii featuring co-production from Albin Nedler and Kristoffer Fogelmark, and vocals from American singer Aloe Blacc. It was released on 10 April 2019 and is included on his posthumous third studio album Tim, released on 6 June 2019. The single is also his second number-one (and his first posthumously charted single to reach number-one), as well as Blacc's first, on Billboards Dance/Mix Show Airplay chart, in its 1 June 2019 issue.

The song was produced by Albin Nedler, Kristoffer Fogelmark, and Avicii. It features an interpolation of "No Scrubs" by TLC, written by Tameka Cottle, Kandi Burruss, and Kevin "She'kspere" Briggs.

The song was released alongside a video featuring comments on the Avicii Memory Board, as well as a behind-the-scenes video that was released two hours prior. It debuted at number one on the singles chart in Sweden on two days of sales.

Background
The song was completed by a team of writers and producers following Avicii's death in April 2018. It was said to be "75–80% done" at the time of his death.

Co-producers Kristoffer Fogelmark and Albin Nedler confirmed that after Avicii's death, they received the MIDI file for the song that he had produced, and said that all the sounds and notes in the song were from Avicii himself without any additional production. The only additional production done on the track was for Aloe Blacc's vocals.

Though Avicii had suggested Aloe Blacc as a potential singer for the song, Blacc recorded his vocals after Avicii's death.

Credits and personnel
Credits adapted from Tidal.

 Albin Nedler – songwriter, producer, vocal producer, engineer, keyboards, programming
 Kristoffer Fogelmark – songwriter, producer, vocal producer, engineer, keyboards, programming
 Avicii – songwriter, producer, keyboards, programming
 Tameka Cottle – songwriter
 Kandi Burruss – songwriter
 Kevin "She'kspere" Briggs – songwriter
 Aloe Blacc – vocals
 Marcus Thunberg Wessel – engineer
 Richard "Segal" Huredia – engineer
 Kevin Grainger – mixing and mastering

Charts

Weekly charts

Year-end charts

Certifications

Release history

See also
 List of number-one singles of 2019 (Finland)
 List of number-one singles of the 2010s (Sweden)

References

2019 singles
2019 songs
Songs released posthumously
Avicii songs
Aloe Blacc songs
Number-one singles in Sweden
Songs written by Avicii
Songs written by Tameka Cottle
Songs written by Kandi Burruss
Songs written by Kevin "She'kspere" Briggs
Song recordings produced by Avicii
Songs written by Kristoffer Fogelmark
Torch songs
Songs written by Albin Nedler